An oversize permit is a document obtained from a state, county, city or province (Canada) to authorize travel in the specified jurisdiction for oversize/overweight truck movement.  In most cases it will list the hauler's name, the description of the load and its dimensions, and a route they are required to travel.  They may be obtained from the transportation department/agency of the issuing jurisdiction or from a company specializing in transportation permits, called a permit service.

Road transport